This is a list of mayors of Springfield, Massachusetts. Springfield became a city in 1852.

Gallery

See also
Mayoral elections in Springfield, Massachusetts

 
Springfield
Springfield, Massachusetts-related lists